Todd Davis may refer to:

Todd Davis (American football) (born 1992), American football player
Todd Davis (businessman) (born 1968), American entrepreneur
Todd F. Davis, American poet and critic

See also
Tod Davis (1924–1978), American baseball player